Bopindolol (INN) is a beta blocker. It is an ester which acts as a prodrug for its active metabolite 4-(3-t-butylamino-2-hydroxypropoxy)-2-methylindole.

See also
 Pindolol

References

Beta blockers
Prodrugs
Benzoate esters
N-tert-butyl-phenoxypropanolamines
Indole ethers at the benzene ring